Sara Errani and Roberta Vinci were the defending champions but decided not to participate.

Irina-Camelia Begu and Monica Niculescu won in the final, defeating Chuang Chia-jung and Marina Erakovic, 6–7(4–7), 7–6(7–4), [10–5].

Seeds
The top seeds received a bye into the quarterfinals.

Draw

Draw

References
 Main Draw

Doubles
2012